"What a piece of work is a man!" is a phrase within a monologue by Prince Hamlet in William Shakespeare's play  Hamlet. Hamlet is reflecting, at first admiringly, and then despairingly, on the human condition.

The speech

The monologue, spoken in the play by Prince Hamlet to Rosencrantz and Guildenstern in Act II, Scene 2, follows in its entirety. Rather than appearing in blank verse, the typical mode of composition of Shakespeare's plays, the speech appears in straight prose:

Differences between texts
The speech was fully omitted from Nicholas Ling's 1603 First Quarto, which reads simply:

This version has been argued to have been a bad quarto, a tourbook copy, or an initial draft. By the 1604 Second Quarto, the speech is essentially present but punctuated differently:

Then, by the 1623 First Folio, it appeared as:

J. Dover Wilson, in his notes in the New Shakespeare edition, observed that the Folio text "involves two grave difficulties", namely that according to Elizabethan thought angels could apprehend but not act, making "in action how like an angel" nonsensical, and that "express" (which as an adjective means "direct and purposive") makes sense applied to "action", but goes very awkwardly with "form and moving".

These difficulties are remedied if we read it thus:

Sources
A source well known to Shakespeare is Psalm 8, especially verse 5: "You have made [humans] a little lower than the heavenly beings and crowned them with glory and honor."

Scholars have pointed out this section's similarities to lines written by Montaigne:

However, rather than being a direct influence on Shakespeare, Montaigne may have merely been reacting to the same general atmosphere of the time, making the source of these lines one of context rather than direct influence.

References in later works of fiction and music

Film
 At the conclusion of the Lindsay Anderson film Britannia Hospital (1982), the computer which is the outcome of Professor Millar's Genesis project recites "What a piece of Work is a Man" up to "how like a God", at which point it repeats the line over and over.
 In the film Down and Out in Beverly Hills (1986), Jerry Baskin, played by Nick Nolte, recites this speech on the pier.
 In Bruce Robinson's British film Withnail & I (1987), the credits roll after lead character Withnail recites the monologue to an audience of wolves in London Zoo.
 In Gettysburg (1993), Union Colonel Joshua Lawrence Chamberlain recites from the speech while discussing slavery. To which Sergeant Kilrain responds "Well, if he's an angel, all right then... But he damn well must be a killer angel."
 In the film Grosse Pointe Blank (1997), Mr. Newberry says to Martin: "What a piece of work is man!  How noble... oh, fuck it, let's have a drink and forget the whole damn thing."
 In the film Madagascar (2005), the penguin "Private" tries to enter code into the ship's navigation system by randomly jumping on the keyboard. A section of text on the screen that was entered as "WhATApiece OFworkisPenGuin". This may be a possible reference to the Infinite monkey theorem.
 In the stop motion animation film Coraline (2009), the other Ms. Spink and Forcible recite it while performing their trapeze acrobatics.
 In the vampire film Only Lovers Left Alive (2013), directed by Jim Jarmusch, parts of the monologue are quoted.  Notably, Adam (Tom Hiddleston) utters "quintessence of dust" at the death bed of the vampire Marlowe.  The plot includes the suggestion that the latter was the original author of the Shakespeare oeuvre, as some eccentric critics have argued (see Marlovian theory of Shakespeare authorship).
 One of Sonya's students performs the piece at school in A Man Called Ove.

Stage productions
 In the 1967 rock musical Hair, numerous lyrics are derived from Hamlet, most notably a song titled "What a Piece of Work Is Man", which uses much of the speech verbatim.
 In the Reduced Shakespeare Company's production The Complete Works of William Shakespeare (abridged), the more famous soliloquy, "To be, or not to be", is omitted from the Hamlet portion of the production, not for time constraints, or because the speech is so well known, but because the group states that they dislike the speech for momentum and motivation reasons. The "What a piece of work is a man" speech is delivered in its stead.

Television
 In the Babylon 5 episode "The Paragon of Animals", one of the characters, Byron, recites Hamlet'''s "how noble is man..." speech to Lyta Alexander. He uses it to contrast the human race's claim to nobility and compassion with their actual treatment of telepaths like Byron and Lyta.
 In the third-season finale of Person of Interest, titled "Deus Ex Machina", part of the monologue is paraphrased by the character John Greer, instead referencing the artificial intelligence system known as The Machine: "What a piece of work is your Machine, Harold. "In action, how like an angel. In apprehension, how like a god.""
 The ninth episode of the seventh season of Sons of Anarchy is titled "What A Piece Of Work Is Man". This is a reference to the Shakespearean influence of the hit TV series.
 Star Trek features many allusions to Shakespeare. In the Star Trek: The Next Generation episode “Hide and Q”, Q mocks humanity to Captain Jean-Luc Picard by means of Shakespeare quotations. Picard retorts by paraphrasing Hamlet's monologue, noting that "what he might say with irony, I say with conviction."
 In season 12 episode 13 of ER'', reference is made by Dr. Victor Clemente to Shakespeare as being how he knows the meaning of the word quintessence. Later he paraphrases the "What a piece of work is man!" monologue while at the bedside of his girlfriend who has just suffered multiple gunshot wounds from her husband.

References

Hamlet
Monologues
Shakespearean phrases